Tauno Immanuel Honkanen (born 9 October 1927) is a Finnish former skier. Honkanen was born in Kittilä. He was a member of the national Olympic military patrol team in 1948 which finished second. His military rank at his time was Sotamies.

References

External links
 

1927 births
Possibly living people
People from Kittilä
Finnish military patrol (sport) runners
Olympic biathletes of Finland
Military patrol competitors at the 1948 Winter Olympics
Sportspeople from Lapland (Finland)